The Saudi Arabia Davis Cup team represents Saudi Arabia in Davis Cup tennis competition and are governed by the Saudi Arabian Tennis Federation.

Saudi Arabia currently compete in the Asia/Oceania Zone of Group IV. They have reached Group II on four occasions, but have failed to win a tie at that level.

History
Saudi Arabia competed in its first Davis Cup in 1991.

Total ties Played : 107 ( 53-54 )

Years played : 25 Years

Most total wins : Bader Almugail ( 67 )

Most singles wins : Fahad Alsaad ( 37 wins )

Most doubles wins : Bader Almugai ( 31 wins ) 

Most ties played : Bader Almugail ( 68 ties ) 

Most years played : Bader Almugail ( 17 Years ) 

Oldest player : Bader Almugail ( 39 Years old )

Youngest player : Saud Alhogbani ( 15 Years old )

Current team (2022) 

 Anmar Faleh Alhogbani
 Saud Alhogbani
 Abdullah Alfaraj
 Zaid Ahmed
 Zaki Al Abdullah

See also
Davis Cup

External links

Davis Cup teams
Davis Cup
Davis Cup